The North Carolina Council of State elections of 2016 were held on November 8, 2016 to select the ten officers of the North Carolina Council of State. This elections coincided with the presidential election, elections to the House of Representatives, elections to the Senate and state elections to the General Assembly and judiciary. Primary elections were held March 15.

The ten members of the North Carolina Council of State are statewide-elected officers serving four-year terms. The pre-election partisan makeup of the Council of State consisted of 6 Democrats and 4 Republicans. After the election, the partisan makeup was reversed, with 6 Republicans and 4 Democrats winning. Three incumbents were defeated: Governor Pat McCrory (R), Superintendent of Public Education June Atkinson (D), and Commissioner of Insurance Wayne Goodwin (D).

Governor

Republican Pat McCrory, the incumbent, faced Democratic nominee Roy Cooper, the incumbent North Carolina Attorney General, and Libertarian nominee Lon Cecil in the general election. Cooper won with 49% of the vote.

Lieutenant Governor

Republican Dan Forest, the incumbent, faced Democratic nominee Linda Coleman, a former Director of the Office of State Personnel, former State Representative and nominee for Lieutenant Governor in 2012, and Libertarian nominee Jacki Cole in the general election. Forest won with more than 51% of the vote.

Attorney General

Democrat Roy Cooper, the incumbent, ran for governor.

Josh Stein, State Senator and former Deputy Attorney General of North Carolina, was the Democratic nominee for the post, and Buck Newton, another State Senator, was the Republican nominee. Stein won with just over 50% of the vote.

Secretary of State
Democrat Elaine Marshall, the incumbent, ran for a sixth term.

Democratic primary

Candidates
Elaine Marshall, Incumbent (unopposed in the primary)

Republican primary

Candidates
A.J. Daoud, member of state lottery commission, 2012 candidate
Michael LaPaglia, businessman

Results

General election

Results

State Auditor
Democrat Beth A. Wood, the incumbent, ran for reelection to a third term.

Democratic primary

Candidates
Beth A. Wood, incumbent (unopposed in the primary)

Republican primary

Candidates
Chuck Stuber, former FBI special agent (unopposed in the primary)

General election

Results

Stuber called for a recount even before the election results were officially certified, and it seemed likely that the margin of difference between the candidates would remain well under the 10,000-vote threshold that a recount requires. But as the recount neared completion and the outcome remained the same, Stuber conceded the election on Dec. 9.

State Treasurer
Janet Cowell, a Democrat and the incumbent Treasurer, announced she would not run for reelection.

Democratic primary

Candidates
Dan Blue III, attorney, former investment banker, former Wake County Democratic Party chair
Ron Elmer, CPA and money manager

Results

Republican primary

Candidates
Dale Folwell, CPA and former state representative (unopposed in the primary)

General election

Results

Folwell became the first North Carolina State Treasurer elected from a party other than the Democratic Party since William H. Worth, a Populist, was elected in 1896.

Superintendent of Public Instruction
Democrat June Atkinson, the incumbent, ran for a fourth term in 2016. When it was believed that Atkinson was not going to run for re-election, State Rep. Tricia Cotham was considered a potential Democratic candidate.

Democratic primary

Candidates
June Atkinson, incumbent
Henry Pankey, retired school principal

Results

Republican primary

Candidates
Mark Johnson, Forsyth County School Board member
Dr. Rosemary Stein, Physician, former Alamance Community College Trustee & GOP Activist
J. Wesley Sills, teacher

Results

General election

Results

Johnson became the first Republican (or member of any party other than the Democratic Party) elected Superintendent since 1896, when Charles H. Mebane was elected.

Commissioner of Agriculture
Republican Steve Troxler, the incumbent, ran for a fourth term.

Democratic primary

Candidates
 Walter Smith, former Mayor of Boonville, former USDA official and nominee in 2012 (unopposed in the primary)

Republican primary

Candidates
Andy Stevens
Steve Troxler, incumbent

Results

General election

Results

Steve Troxler received more votes than any other candidate in North Carolina in 2016. As of 2021, this is the last statewide election in which the Republican candidate won Wake County and Chatham County.

Commissioner of Labor
Republican Cherie Berry, the incumbent, ran for reelection to a fifth term.

Democratic primary

Candidates
Mazie Ferguson
Charles Meeker, attorney and former Mayor of Raleigh

Results

Republican primary

Candidates
Cherie Berry, incumbent (unopposed in the primary)

General election

Results

Commissioner of Insurance
Democrat Wayne Goodwin, the incumbent, ran for re-election to a third term in 2016.

Democratic primary

Candidates
Wayne Goodwin, incumbent (unopposed in the primary)

Republican primary

Candidates
Mike Causey, former lobbyist and failed GOP nominee for state Insurance Commissioner in 1992, 1996, 2000, and 2012, and losing candidate for Congress in 2014
Joe McLaughlin, former Onslow County commissioner
Ron Pierce, General Contractor, Ex-Airline Mechanic & Army Veteran

Withdrawn
Heather Grant, Yadkinville nurse and Republican primary candidate for US Senate in 2014

Results

General election

Results

Causey became the first Republican ever elected to the office of North Carolina Commissioner of Insurance.

See also
North Carolina Council of State elections: 1996, 2000, 2004, 2008, 2012.

References

External links
NC State Board of Elections

Council of State
2016
North Carolina Council of State